Désirée of Sweden may refer to:

Désirée Clary or Desideria (1777–1860), Queen consort of Sweden and Norway 1818
Princess Désirée, Baroness Silfverschiöld (born 1938), Princess of Sweden